Bernardo Silva (26 September 1935 – 1997) was a Portuguese sailor. He competed in the Finn event at the 1968 Summer Olympics.

References

External links
 

1935 births
1997 deaths
Portuguese male sailors (sport)
Olympic sailors of Portugal
Sailors at the 1968 Summer Olympics – Finn
Sportspeople from Cascais